Moses Hayden (June 1785February 13, 1830) was an American lawyer and politician from New York.

Life
He was the son of Dr. Moses Hayden (1742–1813) and Triphena (French, Childs) Hayden (b. 1756). He completed preparatory studies, and graduated from Williams College in 1804. Then he studied law, was admitted to the bar in 1808, and commenced practice in Pittsfield, Massachusetts. On August 8, 1809, he married Elizabeth Williams (d. 1825). They had no children.

Later he removed to York, New York, and was First Judge of the Livingston County Court from 1821 to 1823.

Hayden was elected as an Adams-Clay Democratic-Republican to the 18th, and re-elected as an Adams man to the 19th United States Congress, holding office from March 4, 1823, to March 3, 1827.

He was an Anti-Masonic member of the New York State Senate (8th D.) from 1829 until his death in 1830, sitting in the 52nd and 53rd New York State Legislatures. He was buried at the Mount Pleasant Cemetery in Fowlerville, a hamlet in York.

References
 [gives "near Westfield" as birthplace, and 1786 as birthdate]
The New York Civil List compiled by Franklin Benjamin Hough (pages 71, 128, 142 and 361; Weed, Parsons and Co., 1858)
Records of the Connecticut Line of the Hayden Family by Jabez Haskell Hayden & William Benjamin Hayden (1888; page 147) [gives Conway as birthplace, and June 1785 as birthdate]
Bench and Bar of the Commonwealth of Massachusetts by William Thomas Davis (1895; pages 288 and 491) [has two entries of Moses Hayden, one giving Conway as birthplace, one giving "in Westfield", and 1786 as birthdate]
Hayden genealogy at New England Genealogy [gives for Dr. Moses Hayden two sons named Moses, one (1767–1855) with first wife, and the subject of this article with second wife]
History of Berkshire County, Massachusetts (1885; pages 339f) [gives Conway as birthplace]

External links

1786 births
1830 deaths
Williams College alumni
New York (state) National Republicans
People from Conway, Massachusetts
People from York, New York
New York (state) state senators
Anti-Masonic Party politicians from New York (state)
New York (state) state court judges
Democratic-Republican Party members of the United States House of Representatives from New York (state)
National Republican Party members of the United States House of Representatives
19th-century American politicians
19th-century American judges